Gleb Sergeyevich Fedotov (born 20 September 1995) is a former Russian football player.

Club career
He made his professional debut in the Russian Football National League for FC Khimik Dzerzhinsk on 23 March 2014 in a game against FC Sibir Novosibirsk.

References

External links

1995 births
Living people
Russian footballers
Association football midfielders
FC Khimik Dzerzhinsk players